Ein Hatzeva (lit. Hatzeva Spring) is a moshav in the central Arava valley in Israel. Located south of the Dead Sea, it falls under the jurisdiction of Tamar Regional Council. In 2019 it had a population of 50.

History
Ein Hatzeva was founded in 1960 as an unaffiliated agriculture farm, and was not recognized by the government. The founders attempted to grow vegetables in the arid Arava area, and the village was recognized upon their success.

It was named after the nearby Hatzeva Spring, which in turn takes its name from the Arabic name, Ayn Husb. The location was mentioned in Greek texts as Eisebon.

References

Moshavim
Populated places established in 1960
1960 establishments in Israel
Populated places in Southern District (Israel)